Henrik Malberg (1873–1958) was a Danish actor of theater and Danish cinema who played his most noted role at the age of 80—the stoic authoritative farm owner in the Carl Theodor Dreyer classic film Ordet.

Career 

Henrik Martin Marinus Malberg was born in Aarhus Denmark on 4 December 1873. Originally trained as a mechanic, Malberg made his stage debut at the Århus Teater in 1896. Malberg worked with a touring company for several years but between 1902 and 1905 he was based with the Aarhus Theater. While playing the role of Arv in Masquerade, Malberg was noticed by the Danish actor Olaf Poulsen who brought him to Copenhagen. For the next five years, Malberg was the principal actor at the Dagmar Theater in Copenhagen. In 1910, he became director for a Danish touring company, then once again returned to the Dagmar (1912–1914) and afterwards, the Alexander Theater (1914–1917). In his later years, Malberg was employed at the Royal Danish Theatre in Copenhagen.

Malberg made his screen debut in the 1910 silent film, The Picture of Dorian Gray. He appeared in several more films during the silent era for the major Danish directors of the period: George Schnéevoigt, Emanuel Gregers, Holger-Madsen and Lau Lauritzen, Sr. He also performed in three Fy & Bi comedies. Then in 1930, Malberg performed the lead role in the first purely Danish sound film as the priest in the crime mystery Præsten i Vejlby. A man of large stature and booming voice, Malberg was primarily a stage performer, and his film performances are described as imposing and theatrical. It was not until he was 80 years old that Malberg played his most memorable role—as the farm owner Morten Borgen in the classic Carl Th. Dreyer film Ordet (The Word). Malberg credited Dreyer with teaching him the art of film acting.

Afterward Malberg travelled around Denmark to teach and to perform for school children. At the age of 84, he toured 55 Copenhagen area schools and a dozen in Jutland, giving a two-hour performance at each. 

Malberg died two months before his 85th birthday after falling from a ladder. During his long career, Malberg appeared in 21 films. Malberg also cowrote two stage plays: Bolettes Brudefærd (with Orla Bock) and Gamle Postgaard (with Axel Frische). Malberg performed in the 1938 movie version of Bolettes Brudefærd with his brother Peter Malberg and Bodil Ipsen. Malberg was an honorary member of the Danish Actor's Union for which he sat on the board for 36 years.

Personal life
Malberg was the son of Peter Broch Malberg and Catrine Marie Schebye. His brother, Peter Malberg, was also an actor. Malberg married Anna Augusta Hansenmeyer on 11 May 1906. Malberg died on 28 September 1958. The address in Aarhus where Malberg was born houses a dinner theater.

Filmography

References

External links

1873 births
1958 deaths
Danish male film actors
Danish male silent film actors
20th-century Danish male actors
Danish male stage actors
People from Aarhus